is a 1987 to 1991 cyberpunk original video animation (OVA) series produced by Youmex and animated by AIC and Artmic. The series was planned to run for 13 episodes, but was cut short to just 8.

The series involves the adventures of the Knight Sabers, an all-female group of mercenaries who don powered exoskeletons and fight numerous problems, most frequently rogue robots. The success of the series spawned several sequel series.

Plot

The series begins in late 2032, seven years after the Second Great Kanto earthquake has split Tokyo geographically and culturally in two and it also forced the United States of America to annex Japan in the legitimate name of keeping the peace and from it descending into anarchy . During the first episode, disparities in wealth are shown to be more pronounced than in previous periods in post-war Japan. The main adversary is Genom, a megacorporation with immense power and global influence. Its main product are boomers—artificial cybernetic life forms that are usually in the form of humans, with most of their bodies being machine; also known as "cyberoids". While Boomers are intended to serve mankind, they become deadly instruments in the hands of ruthless individuals. The AD Police (Advanced Police) are tasked to deal with Boomer-related crimes. One of the series' themes is the inability of the department to deal with threats due to political infighting, red tape, and an insufficient budget.

Setting
The setting displays strong influences from the movies Blade Runner and Streets of Fire. The opening sequence of episode 1 is even modeled on that of the latter film. The humanoid robots known as "boomers" in the series were inspired by several movies, including Replicants from the aforementioned Blade Runner, the titular cyborgs of the Terminator film franchise, and the Beast from the film Krull.

Suzuki explained in a 1993 Animerica interview the meaning behind the cryptic title: "We originally named the series 'bubblegum' to reflect a world in crisis, like a chewing-gum bubble that's about to burst."

Production
The series started with Toshimichi Suzuki's intention to remake the 1982 film Techno Police 21C. In 1985, he met Junji Fujita and the two discussed ideas, and decided to collaborate on what later became Bubblegum Crisis. Kenichi Sonoda acted as character designer, and designed the four female leads. Masami Ōbari created the mechanical designs. Obari would also go on to direct episodes 5 and 6. Satoshi Urushihara acted as the chief production supervisor and guest character designer for Episode 7.

The OVA series is eight episodes long but was originally slated to run for 13 episodes. Due to legal problems between Artmic and Youmex, who jointly held the rights to the series, the series was discontinued prematurely.

Cast

Additional voices
English: Amanda Tancredi, Chuck Denson Jr., Chuck Kinlaw, David Kraus, Eliot Preschutti, Gray Sibley, Hadley Eure, Hank Troscianiec, J. Patrick Lawlor, Jack Bowden, Jay Bryson, Kevin Reilly, Marc Garber, Marc Matney, Michael Sinterniklaas, Scott Simpson, Sean Clay, Sophia Tolar, Steve Lalla, Steve Rassin, Steve Vernon, Zach Hanner

Episodes

Release
In North America, AnimEigo first released Bubblegum Crisis to VHS and Laserdisc in 1991 in Japanese with English subtitles. The series is notable in that it was one of the few early anime series that were brought over from Japan unedited and subtitled in English. While anime has become much more popular in the years since, in 1991, it was still mostly unknown as a storytelling medium in North America. Bubblegum Crisis was aired in the US when it first aired on PBS affiliate Superstation KTEH in the 1990s, and STARZ!'s Action Channel in 2000. 

An English dub of the series was produced beginning in 1994 by AnimEigo through Southwynde Studios in Wilmington, NC, and released to VHS and Laserdisc beginning that year. A digitally-remastered compilation, featuring bilingual audio tracks and production extras, was released on DVD in 2004 by AnimEigo. The company later successfully crowdfunded a collector's edition Blu-ray release through Kickstarter in November 2013. The series was released on a regular edition Blu-ray on September 25, 2018. The series is currently available for streaming on Night Flight Plus.

Soundtracks
There are eight soundtrack releases (one per OVA), as well as numerous "vocal" albums which feature songs "inspired by" the series as well as many drawn directly from it.

Reception
Critical reception of Bubblegum Crisis has been generally positive. Raphael See of THEM Anime Reviews gave the series a rating of 4 out of 5 stars, praising the quality of the animation, the soundtrack, and the series' sense of humor. However, he suggested it was held back by a low quality dub, a lack of character development, and an inconsistent plot, saying that while some episodes were "really solid", others would leave out many major details, forcing the viewer to make their own assumptions: "Overall, not a bad watch. In fact, at times, Bubblegum Crisis can be really good. Unfortunately, oversights and carelessness here and there keep this series from being all it can be."

Tim Henderson of Anime News Network gave the series an A- rating, praising the animation, soundtrack, story, and characters. He states that the series gets better with every passing episode, and that the final two episodes are the best of the series.

Legacy
Masaki Kajishima and Hiroki Hayashi, who both worked on the Bubblegum Crisis OVAs, cite the show as being the inspiration for their harem series Tenchi Muyo! Ryo-Ohki. In an interview with AIC, Hayashi described Bubblegum Crisis as "a pretty gloomy anime. Serious fighting, complicated human relationships, and dark Mega Tokyo." They thought it would be fun to create some comedy episodes with ideas like the girls going to the hot springs, but it was rejected by the sponsors. He also said that there was a trend to have a bunch of characters of one gender and a single one of the other gender, and asked what if Mackey (Sylia's brother) was a main character, reversing the Bubblegum scenario. This idea then became the basis for Tenchi. Hayashi said that Mackey is "sort of" the original model for Tenchi.

Kevin Siembieda's becoming aware of "Boomers" being already in use in this caused him to change his planned name for the Rifts RPG which he had named after the "Boom Gun"–wielding power armor which was also renamed to Glitter Boy.

Other entries
 A.D. Police Files is a three-part original video animation prequel produced by Youmex and animated by Artmic and AIC, released in 1990. It takes place in the original Bubblegum Crisis universe, and is a prequel to the original OVA series.
 Bubblegum Crash is a sequel to Bubblegum Crisis, released in 1991. It takes place one year after the events of Crisis and follows a dissolved Knight Sabers as they try to figure out their paths in life before being forced to join forces one more time to take down a powerful enemy.
 Bubblegum Crisis Tokyo 2040 is a 26-episode anime television series broadcast in 1998–1999. It is a reboot of the original series.
 A.D. Police: To Protect and Serve is 12-episode anime television series released in 1999. It is a prequel to Bubblegum Crisis Tokyo 2040.
 Parasite Dolls is a three-part original video animation series by AIC, released in 2003. It is set in the original Bubblegum Crisis universe, taking place after the events of the original OVA series.

Crossover appearances
In 1993, it appeared on Scramble Wars, a crossover event between Bubblegum Crisis, Gall Force, Genesis Survivor Gaiarth, AD Police and Riding Bean.

Other media

RPGs
 Bubblegum Crisis role-playing game produced by R. Talsorian Games. It introduces an alternate setting named "Bubblegum Crossfire", basing on a premise that data units with hardsuit blueprints have been sent to more individuals than just Sylia Stingray, resulting in that by 2033 there are numerous Knight Saber-like groups spread all over the globe. RTG's license to produce this game has expired and at present all copies of back stock have been sold.
 "Bubblegum Crisis: Before and After" (covering material from A.D. Police Files and Bubblegum Crash!)
 "Bubblegum Crisis EX" which includes completely new materials (also incorporating early design concepts for BGC mecha and hardsuits as new variants)

Novels
The series' creator Toshimichi Suzuki wrote two novels:

 Bubblegum Crisis Vol. 1: Silent Fanfare, Fujimi Shobo
 Bubblegum Crisis Vol. 2: Break Down-48, Fujimi Shobo
 A third novel titled Bubblegum Crisis Hard Metal Guardians was also later written by Hajime Shima and released in 2012

Comic book
In Japan, a number of comic books were produced that featured characters and storylines based in the same universe. Some were very much thematically linked to the OVA series, while others were "one-shots" or comedy features. A number of artists participated in the creation of these comics, including Kenichi Sonoda, who had produced the original Knight Saber character designs. A North American comic based in the Bubblegum Crisis universe was published in English by Dark Horse Comics.

 Go! Go! Sabers!, a comic by Tokio Kazuka.
 Soldier Blue, a comic by Toshimichi Suzuki. It serves as a prequel to Bubblegum Crash! It was also made as an audio drama. It was translated into English language in 1997 by R.Talsorian Games. A copy of the translated dialogue can be found here.
 Bubblegum Crisis: Grand Mal produced by Adam Warren via Dark Horse Comics.

Video games
 Crime Wave: a game for PC-88, set in Megatokyo and featuring Knight Sabers as the main characters.
 Bubblegum Crash: a game for TurboGrafx-16.

Live-action movie
In May 2009 it was announced that a live-action movie of "Bubblegum Crisis" was in the early stages of production. A production agreement was signed at the 2009 Cannes Film Festival. The film was expected to be released in late 2012 with a budget of 30 million. The production staff was said to have consulted with the original anime's staff members, Shinji Aramaki and Kenichi Sonoda, to help maintain consistency with the world of the original. However, no further developments have been announced.

References

External links
 AnimEigo's Bubblegum Crisis website
 Bubblegum Crisis – AIC's official Bubblegum Crisis page 
 
 

 
1987 anime OVAs
1991 anime OVAs
Action anime and manga
Anime International Company
Artificial intelligence in fiction
Cyberpunk anime and manga
Dengeki Comics
Fiction about robots
Girls with guns anime and manga
Madman Entertainment anime
Mecha anime and manga
Science fiction anime and manga
Seinen manga
Television series set in the 2030s
Superheroes in anime and manga